Priotyrannus is a genus of long-horned beetles in the subfamily Prioninae found in the Old World tropics within the Indo-Malayan Realm. Species in the genus include:

 Priotyrannus mordax
 Priotyrannus closteroides
 Priotyrannus closteroides lutauensis
 Priotyrannus hueti
 Priotyrannus megalops

References 

Cerambycidae genera
Prioninae